1988 Hong Kong–Shanghai Cup was the 23rd staging of Hong Kong-Shanghai Cup. Hong Kong captured the champion by winning 3-2.

Squads
The following are part of the squads for both teams.

Hong Kong
 Chan Su Ming 陳樹明
 Cheung Chi Tak 張志德
 Lai Lo Kau 賴羅球
 Leung Sui Wing 梁帥榮
 Yu Kwok Sum 余國森
 Leslie Santos 山度士
 Kum Kam Fai 顧錦輝
 Sze Wai Shan 施維山
 Lai Wing Cheong 黎永昌
 Tim Bredbury 巴貝利
 Chan Fat Chi 陳發枝
 Yu Kin Tak 茹建德
 Lam Hing Lun 林慶麟

Shanghai
 Li Rao 李曉
 Zheng Yan 鄭彥
 Tang Chuansun 唐全順

Result

References

1987
Hong
Shan